The 2012–13 Österreichische Basketball Bundesliga was the 67th season of the Österreichische Basketball Bundesliga. 11 teams participated this season, BC Zepter Vienna was the eventual champion and Oberwart Gunners the runner-up.

Regular season
After two rounds this were the final standings. In the first round all teams faced each other, in the second round the 6 best teams from the first round played each other and the 5 worst teams.
Xion Dukes Klosterneuburg
BC Zepter Vienna
ece Bulls Kapfenberg
Oberwart Gunners
Allianz Swans Gmunden
UBC ökoStadt Güssing Knights
WBC Raiffeisen Wels
BSC Raiffeisen Panthers Fürstenfeld
UBSC Raiffeisen Graz
Arkadia Traiskirchen Lions
Chin Min Dragons

Playoffs

Awards
Most Valuable Player
 Seamus Boxley (Oberwart Gunners)
Finals MVP
 Shawn Ray (basketball) (BC Zepter Vienna)
Austrian MVP
 Thomas Klepeisz (UBC ökoStadt Güssing Knights)
Coach of the Year
 Werner Sallomon (Xion Dukes Klosterneuburg)

Statistical leaders

Points

Rebounds

Assists

References

Österreichische Basketball Bundesliga seasons
Austrian
Lea